This is a list of crackers.  A cracker is a baked good typically made from a grain-and-flour dough and usually manufactured in large quantities. Crackers (roughly equivalent to savory biscuits in the United Kingdom and the Isle of Man) are usually flat, crisp, small in size (usually  or less in diameter) and made in various shapes, commonly round or square.

Crackers

 Animal cracker
 Bath Oliver
 Cream cracker
 Crispbread
 Cheese cracker
 Graham cracker
 Hardtack
 Maltose crackers
 Matzo
 Mein gon
 Nantong Xiting Cracker
 Oatcake
 Olive no Hana
 Oyster cracker
 Pletzel
 Rice cracker
 Saltine cracker
 Taralli
 Water biscuit

Brand-name crackers

 Arnott's Shapes 
 Better Cheddars
 Bremner Wafer 
 Captain's Wafers 
 Carr's 
 Cheddars 
 Cheese Nips 
 Cheez-Itz 
 Club Crackers 
 Crown Pilot Crackers
 Drasca
 Goldfish (snack) 
 In a Biskit  
 Pepperidge Farm 
 Premium Plus
 Rice Thins 
 Ritz Crackers 
 Ry-Krisp 
 Ryvita 
 SAO (biscuit) 
 Triscuit 
 TUC (cracker) 
 Vegetable Thins 
 Wasabröd 
 Westminster Cracker Company 
 Wheat Thins
 quakers
popers

Rice crackers

 Rengginang
 Rice cracker
 Senbei

Beika
 Beika
 Arare (food)
 Bakauke
 Kaki no tane
 Olive no Hana
 Senbei

See also

 Cheese and crackers
 List of baked goods
 List of cookies
 List of breads
 Saltine cracker challenge

References

External links
 
 

 
Crackers
Crackers
Crackers